Mitchell Vande Sompel (born February 11, 1997) is a Canadian professional ice hockey defenceman currently playing for the Colorado Eagles in the American Hockey League (AHL). He was selected by the New York Islanders, 82nd overall, in the 2015 NHL Entry Draft.

Playing career

Junior
Vande Sompel played as a youth within the London Jr. Knights program and the London Nationals of the Greater Ontario Junior Hockey League (GOJHL) before he was selected 14th overall in the 2013 OHL Priority Selection by the Oshawa Generals. He made an immediate impact playing major junior in the Ontario Hockey League with the Generals in the 2013–14 season, earning a place in the First All-Rookie Team after contributing offensively from the blueline with 5 goals and 20 assists through 47 regular season games.

In the 2014–15 season, Vande Sompel assuming the top-pairing role with the Generals, recorded his career highs with 51 assists and 63 points through just 58 regular season games. In the post-season he helped Oshawa win the 2015 OHL title and Memorial Cup championship.

Off the back of his successful season, Vande Sompel was selected in the third-round, 82nd overall, by the New York Islanders of the 2015 NHL Entry Draft. He was later signed to a three-year, entry-level contact with the Islanders on October 12, 2016.

During his fourth and final junior season, Vande Sompel was traded by the Generals to his hometown London Knights midway through the 2016–17 season. He totalled 20 goals through 67 regular season games, which ranked second among OHL defensemen.

Professional
Embarking on his professional career, Vande Sompel was reassigned following training camp with the New York Islanders to AHL affiliate, the Bridgeport Sound Tigers, to begin the 2017–18 season. After registering an assist in his professional debut agains the Binghamton Devils on October 7, 2017, Vande Sompel quickly adapted to the AHL and impressively led all Sound Tigers defenceman with 22 assist and co-led with 29 points. As a rookie he also represented Bridgeport at the 2018 AHL All-Star Classic, scoring three goals, tied for most out of any player.

Vande Sompel continued to grow in his development the following season, solidifying his role on the blueline with the Sound Tigers in recording 10 goals and a career high 31 points through 70 regular season games.

Entering his final season of his entry-level contract, Vande Sompel suffered an arm injury during training camp with the Islanders, ruling him out for the entirety of the  season.

He was re-signed as a restricted free agent by the Islanders to a two-year contract extension on October 28, 2020. In suffering a setback through his injury, Vande Sompel struggled making his return during the pandemic-shortened 2020–21 season with no just 5 assists with a -19 rating in 20 games.

Entering his fifth season within the Islanders organization, Vande Sompel continuing in the AHL slowly regained his confidence and finished the season 18 points through 56 regular season games.

As a free agent from the Islanders, Vande Sompel having been unable to secure another NHL contract, was signed to a one-year AHL contract with the Colorado Eagles, primary affiliate to the Colorado Avalanche, on July 21, 2022.

Personal life
Vande Sompel is the cousin of Buffalo Sabres defenceman Jacob Bryson.

Career statistics

Regular season and playoffs

International

Awards and honours

References

External links
 

1997 births
Living people
Bridgeport Islanders players
Bridgeport Sound Tigers players
Colorado Eagles players
London Knights players
New York Islanders draft picks
Oshawa Generals players